Polanco, officially the Municipality of Polanco (Subanen: Benwa Polanco; Chavacano: Municipalidad de Polanco), is a 3rd class municipality in the province of Zamboanga del Norte, Philippines. According to the 2020 census, it has a population of 42,265 people.

Most of land of Polanco was owned by the influential family of Realiza, led by Don Gaudencio N. Realiza during the times of American regime in the Philippines. The present land they own are large parts of Labrador (Prinda), Bethlehem, Dansullan, Guinles, Macleodes, New Sicayab, New Lebangon, Sianib, South Polanco, and Obay.

Geography

Barangays
Polanco is politically subdivided into 30 barangays. Lingasad, Silawe, Isis, and Loboc (present-day San Miguel) became barrios in 1954. In 1955, the sitios of Prenda, Balangbang, Marantaw, Tamsi, Serabang Gamay and Serabang Daku became barrio Prenda, while sitios of Bandera, Pian, Biga-an, Upper Genatulan, Lower Sinaman and Miasi became barrio Bandera.

In 1957, the sitios of Dilawa, Desin, Lambog, Gumatob, Boboringan, Tubongon, Debolok, Tiaman, Guintom, Lower Disoy, and New Tipan were converted into the barrio of Milad.

Sianib is a rural village (barangay)  located approximately twenty minutes by highway from Polanco. Community services include both an international primary school and high school, active Catholic and Christian evangelical congregations, and a small shopping district including video karaoke with many enthusiastic local singers. Sianib is also home to Barangay Brands International, a test marketing center for retail grocery product promotion and to Comfort of Home Homes, Inc., which is a housing cooperative. Most jobs are in agriculture ranging from rice to abundant seasonal fruit production including mangosteen, rambutan, coconut and banana. Other employers include a beauty products manufacturer, sawmill and a charcoal factory.

Climate

Demographics

Economy

Notable personalities

Resil Mojares (b. 1943) - Cebu City-based historian and literary critic; National Artist of the Philippines for Literature

References

External links
 Polanco Profile at PhilAtlas.com
 [ Philippine Standard Geographic Code]
Philippine Census Information

Municipalities of Zamboanga del Norte